SS Johan Printz was a Liberty ship built in the United States during World War II. She was named after Johan Printz, the governor from 1643 until 1653, of the Swedish colony of New Sweden, in North America.

Construction
Johan Printz was laid down on 7 August 1944, under a Maritime Commission (MARCOM) contract, MC hull 2375, by J.A. Jones Construction, Brunswick, Georgia; she was sponsored by Mrs. Glenn Fite, and launched on 18 September 1944.

History
She was allocated to the Parry Navigation Company, on 29 September 1944. On 24 October 1947, she was laid up in the National Defense Reserve Fleet in Wilmington, North Carolina. On 25 March 1958, she was laid up in the National Defense Reserve Fleet in the James River Group, Lee Hall, Virginia. On 10 July 1970, she was sold for $40,300, to Northern Metal Company, for scrapping. She was removed from the fleet on 28 July 1970.

References

Bibliography

 
 
 
 
 

 

Liberty ships
Ships built in Brunswick, Georgia
1944 ships
Wilmington Reserve Fleet
James River Reserve Fleet